HWC may refer to:

 Heavy Weight Champ
 Head Wound City
 Health and Wellness Center
 Health and Wellness Center (Marshall University)
 Hot Water Cylinder (in Australia and New Zealand)